Chandal is a town in Barisal Division, Bangladesh. It is located at 23°10'0N 91°0'0E with an altitude of 9 metres (32 feet).

References

Populated places in Barisal Division